Widgrenia is a species of plants in the family Apocynaceae first described as a genus in 1900. It contains only one known species, Widgrenia corymbosa, native to Paraguay, Brazil (States of Paraná and Minas Gerais), and NW Argentina (Corrientes Province).

References

Asclepiadoideae
Flora of South America
Monotypic Apocynaceae genera
Taxa named by Gustaf Oskar Andersson Malme